Plaza de España is a Spanish comedy television series broadcast on La 1 of Televisión Española from July to August 2011.

Plot
The Spanish Civil War has come to the people of Peñaseca and the inhabitants have to choose a side and survive the difficult situation. The Civil War sitcom assumes a prism of sitcom through Plaza de España.

Cast
Gorka Otxoa as Sebastián Rivera
César Camino as Tiberio
Eduardo Antuña as Augusto
Miguel Rellán as Don Benito
Mariam Hernández as Remedios
Carmen Esteban as Vicenta
Janfri Topera as Severiano
Goizalde Núñez as Antonia
Alfonso Lara as Pacorro
Javivi as Melitón
Enrique Villén as Serafín Guisado
Ramón Alex
Fernando Asmen as Marquis
Guillermo Quever as Pastor

References

External links

2011 Spanish television series debuts
2010s Spanish comedy television series
2011 Spanish television series endings
La 1 (Spanish TV channel) network series
Television series set in the 1930s
War television series